The Sisa Dukashe Stadium is a multi-purpose stadium in Mdantsane, near East London in the Eastern Cape, South Africa. It is currently used mostly for soccer matches as well as for rugby matches.

References

Soccer venues in South Africa
Sports venues in the Eastern Cape